The Atlante class  is a series of two Deep sea tugboatss of the Italian Navy.

Ships
Atlante tugboats are equipped with a type Britannia tow cable with automatic release, long 400 m 
(diameter of 40 mm), with automatic towing winch for adjusting the shooting power.
They are equipped with exhaustion means for fire intervention on other units and a fixed installation for anti-pollution duties.

References

Auxiliary ships of the Italian Navy
1975 ships
Ships built in Italy
Auxiliary tugboat classes